The Urethra Chronicles is a 1999 documentary film about the American pop punk band Blink-182. The film, directed by former manager Rick DeVoe, is a behind-the-scenes look at the band's history featuring their usual toilet humor. The documentary includes exclusive live performance footage and music videos.

The film was released on November 30, 1999 on VHS and May 2, 2000 for DVD. A sequel, The Urethra Chronicles II: Harder Faster Faster Harder, was released in 2002.

Background
The film explores the lives of Blink-182 members Mark Hoppus, Tom DeLonge, and Travis Barker. The film features footage shot over many years: for example, stunts shot by Hoppus and DeLonge during the recording of sophomore effort Dude Ranch in 1996 open up the film. The film was completed in fall of 1999, shortly before Blink-182 set off on tour with Silverchair. The original title of the documentary was The Diary of the Butt. Hoppus, in a 1999 interview with the MTV Radio Network, described the production as  "...a look back, and also a look ahead."

Contents
The DVD includes all of the official music videos of the singles from the Dude Ranch and Enema of the State albums.

"Dammit" (Directed by Darren Doane)
"Josie" (Directed by Darren Doane)
"What's My Age Again?" (Directed by Marcos Siega)
"All the Small Things" (Directed by Marcos Siega)
"Adam's Song" (Directed by Liz Friedlander)

Two songs were performed live and filmed at the Electric Ballroom in London, England, on November 30, 1999, and are included in the documentary.

"What's My Age Again?"
"All the Small Things"

Bonus features include individual interviews with DeLonge, Hoppus and Barker, and a photo gallery.

Charts

See also
The Urethra Chronicles II: Harder Faster Faster Harder
Riding in Vans with Boys

References

External links
 
 

Blink-182
1999 films
1999 documentary films
American documentary films
Documentary films about punk music and musicians
1990s English-language films
1990s American films